Eugenio Prati (27 January 1842 - 8 March 1907) was an Italian painter, active in the Trentino, painting genre subjects.

Biography
He was born in Caldonazzo in the Trentino. He trained at the Academy of Fine Arts of Venice, and then further studies in Florence at the patronage of a local Baron of Trentino. In 1879, he returns to Trentino, and settles in the Valsugana. Here he dedicated himself to painting mainly rural genre themes, although also some sacred and historic subjects, and costume genre paintings.

He exhibited Ancora un momento e Ritorno da Massaua at the 1887 Esposizione Nazionale di Venezia; the painting Primi fioriin 1892 in Venice, and sent this painting to exhibitions over the next half-decade at Genoa, Chicago, Berlin, and St Petersburg. He painted a Portrait of Maria Sardagna Thun and a Veduta di Passo Buole.

Other works include Abile, Si espetta lo sposo, Time is Money, Nozze in Val di Tesino, and Uomo che piange e preso.

References

External links

1842 births
1907 deaths
19th-century Italian painters
Italian male painters
20th-century Italian painters
Accademia di Belle Arti di Venezia alumni
19th-century Italian male artists
20th-century Italian male artists